Sattai Duraimurugan is an Indian YouTuber, social critic and also known as a staunch Tamil nationalist in Tamil Nadu politics. He is best known for his political criticism mixed with satire. He came in to the limelight when he was arrested for allegedly threatening to attack a person.

Career
He did his B.Sc. in Mathematics from Sadakathullah Appa college in Palayamkottai and has a Masters in Business Management from Annamalai University. He has worked as a medical representative for nine years and due to his passion towards the Tamil language and unable to oversee the situation where the Indian political parties in Tamil Nadu showed indifference and abandoned the people in the genocide in Eelam, he joined Naam Tamilar Katchi (NTK) in 2010, which is seen as an alternate force to Dravidian and National parties. Since then, he has held various posts in the party, that includes  the state speaker and the state youth wing secretary in the party. He is currently a Policy Propagation Secretary in Naam Tamilar Katchi. He launched his YouTube channel in 2018. Now it has more 6.75 million subscribers as of today.

In 2021, Sattai Duraimurugan broke the story about Siva Shankar Baba through his television channel, accusing him of harassing female students at the Sushil Hari International School which is owned by Baba. Duraimurugan investigated the matter till Baba was taken into custody. When the mainstream media chose to ignore the matter, he had information from the expelled pupils from the school.

The government's and the general public's perceptions of the Custodial death of P Jayaraj and Bennicks were significantly impacted by Saattai. In connection with the case, he unveiled four videos that showed the Sathankulam police cruelly torturing the victims.

Cases, arrest and bail
2018 - A case where he went to stop the MDMK cadres who came to attack Naam Tamilar Katchi cadres at Trichy Airport.

In 2019, a case has been filed against Sattai Duraimurugan for talking about Rajiv Gandhi's death.

In June 2021, the Tamil Nadu government unjustly charged Duraimurugan with assault after he gave a book on Prabhakaran to a man who had written disparaging things about the leader and tried to discredit him. He spent 58 days behind bars in the Trichy Prison.

On October 11, 2021, while out on bail from these cases, he took part in a protest organised by Senthamizhan Seeman, the chief coordinator of Naam Tamilar Katchi, in Thakalai, Kanyakumari district. He expresses his frustration with the Tamil Nadu government, claiming that as a fellow citizen, he cannot accept that the government is destroying Tamil Nadu's mountains for the purpose of mining stones for a private port that would be constructed in Kerala.

DMK cadres discovered that the Chief Minister and the Tamil Nadu administration were disparaged in his address during the demonstration. After a case was filed against him, two defamation lawsuits were filed against him in Dharmapuri and Tiruvidaimarudur, and he spent 53 days in the Palayamkottai Central Prison.

He was booked under Goondas Act for the same on 2 January 2022 and he was imprisoned in Pulhal Central Prison and served 7 months of imprisonment. On 13 July 2022 Madras HC dismisses Sattai Duraimurugan arrest on Goonda act and advised to Sattai Duraimurugan after canceling the arrest and imprisonment order under Goonda act.

A case of sedition has been filed against him in Thiruvallur Police Station in December 2021 as a result of a video he posted on his YouTube channel in which he claimed that workers at the Foxconn factory in Sriperumbudur were suffering as a result of food contamination in the ladies hostel and that he was in favour of the workers' strike at the factory. Due to this he was arrested by Tiruvallur district police.

Notable films and programs
Sattai Duraimurugan has played a character role in the film Pettikadai starring Samuthirakani, Chandini Tamilarasan and Varsha Bollamma in the lead roles. He has also acted in Seeman and RK Suresh's upcoming movie Ameera.

Naattu Nadappu (Current Affairs) 
Arivaayudham (Knowledge is power) 
Settaigal (political satire)

References

Indian YouTubers
Living people
People from Tamil Nadu
Year of birth missing (living people)